The Brassiere Hills are a pair of summits in the City and Borough of Juneau, Alaska, United States.

Ice thickness studies of Taku Glacier were conducted near the hills in 1989, 1990, and 1993.

Nancy Bartley of The Seattle Times attributes the naming to photographer Austin Post.

The name was noted by the United States Geological Survey on 1948 and 1962 topographical maps of the Juneau area, but it was removed prior to the latter edition's publication.  It later appeared on a 1997 USGS map.  It was entered into the Geographic Names Information System on March 31, 1981.

References

External links
 

Mountains of Juneau, Alaska
Mountains of Alaska